Don Towsley (May 11, 1912 – November 25, 1986) was an animator working at Walt Disney Animation Studios, and later at MGM and Filmation.

Career
Starting out at Disney, Towsley worked on three shorts in the Silly Symphony series, animating the band in The Cookie Carnival (1935), a scene of dancing hens ultimately cut from Cock o' the Walk (1935), and the introduction and opening scene of Donald's Better Self (1938). In 1938, Towsley became the main animator for the Donald Duck short films, following Fred Spencer's death.

Towsley contributed to the 1940 film Pinocchio, as part of the team responsible for Jiminy Cricket and Monstro the Whale. He also animated the "Pastoral Symphony" segment of the 1940 film Fantasia.

In 1943, Towsley, along with a team of animators, contributed to a wartime animated short film titled Der Fuehrer's Face produced by Walt Disney.

In 1948, after leaving the Disney studio, Towsley created a line of children's wallpaper cutouts, featuring images of animals.

In the 1960s, Towsley worked for MGM's Tom and Jerry series, including animation work on 1965's Haunted Mouse.

Towsley joined the Filmation animation studio in 1968 as an associate director. He directed episodes of Fat Albert and the Cosby Kids (1972–74), My Favorite Martians (1973–75), The New Adventures of Gilligan (1974–77), The U.S. of Archie (1974–76), The New Adventures of Batman (1977), Sabrina, Super Witch (1977–78) and The New Adventures of Flash Gordon (1979–80), among others. He also directed a sequence in Filmation's 1972 film, Journey Back to Oz.

Films worked on

1930s 

Donald's Cousin Gus (1939)
Donald's Golf Game (1938)
Moving Day (1937)
The Cookie Carnival (1936)
Mickey's Service Station (1935)
Two-Gun Mickey (1934)

1940s 

Drip Dippy Donald (1948)
Wide Open Spaces (1947)
Crazy with the Heat (1947)
Donald's Dilemma (1947)
It's a Grand Old Nag (supervising animator) (1947)
Dumb Bell of the Yukon (1946)
Wet Paint (1946)
Donald's Double Trouble (1946)
Sleepy Time Donald (1946)
Old Sequoia (1945)
Cured Duck (1945)
Donald's Crime (1945)
The Plastics Inventor (1944)
Saps in Chaps (1942)
Bambi (additional animation - uncredited) (1942)
Dumbo (1941)
Fantasia (animation supervisor) (segment "The Pastoral Symphony") (1940)
Pinocchio (1940)

1960s 

Pink on the Cob (additional animator: animation) (1969)
Carte Blanched (additional animator: animation)
"The Archie Show" TV series (associate director) (1968)
"The Batman/Superman Hour" TV series (associate director) (1968)
The Bear That Wasn't (1967)
Advance and Be Mechanized (1967)
Cannery Rodent (1967)
Cat and Dupli-cat (1967)
Guided Mouse-ille ... a.k.a. Guided Mouse-ille or Science on a Wet Afternoon (1967)
The Mouse from H.U.N.G.E.R. (1967)
O-Solar Meow (1967)
Purr-Chance to Dream (1967)
Rock 'n' Rodent (1967)
Surf-Bored Cat (1967)
Shutter Bugged Cat (title animation - uncredited) (1967)
How the Grinch Stole Christmas! (TV) ... a.k.a. Dr. Seuss' How the Grinch Stole Christmas! (USA: complete title) (1966)
The A-Tom-Inable Snowman (1966)
Catty-Cornered (1966)
Filet Meow (1966)
Jerry, Jerry, Quite Contrary (1966)
Love Me, Love My Mouse (1966)
Puss 'n' Boats (1966)
Matinee Mouse (title animation - uncredited) (1966)
The Dot and the Line ... a.k.a. The Dot and the Line: A Romance in Lower Mathematics (supervising animator) (1965)
The Man from Button Willow (1965)
Ah, Sweet Mouse-Story of Life (1965)
Bad Day at Cat Rock (1965)
The Brothers Carry-Mouse-Off (1965)
The Cat's Me-Ouch (1965)
Duel Personality (1965)
Haunted Mouse (1965)
I'm Just Wild About Jerry (1965)
Jerry-Go-Round (1965)
Of Feline Bondage (1965)
Tom-ic Energy (1965)
The Year of the Mouse ... a.k.a. Tom Thump (1965)
A Taste of Catnip (additional animation - uncredited) (marking Towsley's last animations of Sylvster) (1965)
The Cat Above and the Mouse Below (1964)
Is There a Doctor in the Mouse? (1964)
Much Ado About Mousing (1964)
Snowbody Loves Me (1964)
The Unshrinkable Jerry Mouse (1964)
Penthouse Mouse (additional/title animation - uncredited) (1963)
The Yogi Bear Show TV series (1961)
Talking of Tomorrow (1960)

1970s and 1980s 

Mickey Mouse Disco (1980)
The Space Sentinels TV series (animation director) ... a.k.a. The Young Sentinels (USA) (1977)
Fraidy Cat (1975)
Oliver Twist (sequence director) (1974)
The New Adventures of Gilligan (director) (1974)
U.S. of Archie (director) (1974)
Treasure Island (sequence director) (1973)
Journey Back to Oz (sequence director) (1972)
The Aristocats (animator) (1970)
The Phantom Tollbooth (animator) (1970)
Horton Hears a Who! (animator) (1970)

References

External links
 

1912 births
1986 deaths
American animators
Walt Disney Animation Studios people
Hanna-Barbera people
Artists from Milwaukee